The Circle Digital Chart, previously known as the Gaon Digital Chart, is the music industry standard record chart ranking the 200 most popular singles in South Korea. It provides rankings on a weekly, monthly, and yearly basis, which is based on an aggregate of streaming, downloads and background music from major South Korean music platforms. It is a part of the Circle Chart, previously known as the Gaon Chart.

History
The Gaon Digital Chart was launched as a part of the Gaon Chart in February 2010, by Korea Music Content Association and South Korea's Ministry of Culture, Sports and Tourism. It started with compiling data from six major South Korean music platforms Melon, Dosirak, Mnet.com, Bugs, Cyworld, and Soribada.

Spotify Korea was included from chart starting December 2021. It currently compiles data from Melon (KakaoMusic), Genie, Flo, Naver VIBE, Bugs, Samsung Music, and Spotify Korea. Apple Music Korea was included from chart starting July 2022.

In July 2022, Gaon Chart was rebranded as the Circle Chart.

Lists of number ones

International chart

Songs with most weeks at number one

11 weeks
BTS – "Dynamite" (2020)
 NewJeans – "Ditto" (2022–23)

7 weeks
Zico – "Any Song" (2020)
 Mirani, Munchman, Khundi Panda, Mushvenom feat. Justhis – "VVS" (2020–21)

6 weeks
 iKon – "Love Scenario" (2018)
 IU – "Celebrity" (2021)
 The Kid Laroi and Justin Bieber – "Stay" (2021)
 Younha – "Event Horizon" (2022)

5 weeks
 IU – "Good Day" (2010–11)
 Psy – "Gangnam Style" (2012) 
 SSAK3 – "Beach Again" (2020)
 Brave Girls – "Rollin'" (2021)
 BTS – "Butter" (2021)
 MSG Wannabe (M.O.M) – "Foolish Love" (2021)
 Kim Min-seok – "Drunken Confession" (2022)
 WSG Wannabe (Gaya-G) – "At That Moment" (2022)

4 weeks
 Miss A – "Bad Girl Good Girl" (2010)
 Twice – "TT" (2016)
 Exo – "Ko Ko Bop" (2017)
 Loco and Hwasa – "Don't Give It to Me" (2018)
 Ben – "180 Degrees" (2018–19)
 Paul Kim – "So Long" (2019)
 AKMU – "How Can I Love the Heartbreak, You're the One I Love" (2019)
 IU – "Blueming" (2019)
 IU feat. Suga – "Eight" (2020)
 Taeyeon – "INVU" (2022)
 Psy feat. Suga – "That That" (2022)
 Ive – "Love Dive" (2022)
 Ive – "After Like" (2022)
 Zico feat. Homies – "New Thing" (2022)

Artist with most number one songs

Artist with most weeks at number one

Artist with most months at number one

Year-end chart

References

External links
 Circle Chart homepage 

2010 establishments in South Korea
South Korean record charts